Tomislav Krizmanić (13 January 1929 – 10 October 2005) was a Croatian boxer. He competed in the men's heavyweight event at the 1952 Summer Olympics.

References

1929 births
2005 deaths
Croatian male boxers
Yugoslav male boxers
Olympic boxers of Yugoslavia
Boxers at the 1952 Summer Olympics
People from Bosanski Petrovac
Heavyweight boxers